Sueo Inoue (born April 12, 1949), better known by the ring names Mighty Inoue and All Mighty Inoue, is a Japanese professional wrestler and referee. He is best known for his appearances with International Wrestling Enterprise from 1967 to 1981, with All Japan Pro-Wrestling from 1981 to 2000 and from 2015 to present, and with Pro Wrestling Noah from 2000 to 2010.

Early life 
While attending high school, Inoue competed in judo.

Professional wrestling career

International Wrestling Enterprise (1967–1981) 
Inoue was trained to wrestle by Billy Robinson and Hiro Matsuda. He debuted on July 21, 1967 for the International Wrestling Enterprise promotion.

From May to October 1972, Inoue wrestled in Montreal, Canada where he teamed with Mitsu Arakawa.

In October 1974, Inoue defeated Superstar Billy Graham in an upset victory to win the IWA World Heavyweight Championship. He held the title until April 1975, when he lost to Mad Dog Vachon.

In 1975, Inoue formed a tag team with Great Kusatsu. Between June 1975 and January 1977, they held the IWA World Tag Team Championship three times. Inoue held the IWA World Tag Team Championship twice more from 1979 to 1981 with Animal Hamaguchi, then a final time with Ashura Hara in 1981.

All Japan Pro Wrestling (1981–2000) 
In 1981, following the closure of International Wrestling Enterprise, Inoue joined All Japan Pro Wrestling full-time as part of its junior heavyweight division. He made his debut in October 1981 during the "Giant Series" tour, forming a tag team with Ashura Hara known as the "Japanese High Flyers". The duo held the All Asia Tag Team Championship from February 1983 to February 1984. 

In February 1984, Inoue defeated Chavo Guerrero to win the NWA International Junior Heavyweight Championship; he held the title until June 1985, when he lost to Dynamite Kid. From 1985 to 1987, he won the All Asia Tag Team Championship twice with Takashi Ishikawa. In January 1989, he defeated Joe Malenko for the World Junior Heavyweight Championship; his reign lasted until March 1989, when he lost to Masanobu Fuchi. From 1990 to 1993, he was part of the Tsuruta-gun stable.

In April 1994, Inoue formed a "legends" stable with Haruka Eigen and Masanobu Fuchi; for the next three years, he primarily competed alongside them in tag team matches and six-man tag team matches. Inoue retired from professional wrestling in April 1997, transitioning to refereeing. During his final months as a wrestler he regularly teamed with Eigen and Futchi to face Giant Baba, Mitsuo Momota, and Rusher Kimura.

Pro Wrestling Noah (2000–2010) 
In 2000, Inoue was among the personnel to leave AJPW to join Mitsuharu Misawa's breakway Pro Wrestling Noah promotion. He worked for Noah as a referee for the next decade. He broke his retirement for a single night on December 31, 2009, wrestling in an elimination match at the "New Year's Eve Special" event jointly promoted by Big Japan Pro Wrestling, DDT Pro-Wrestling, and Kaientai Dojo. He retired from the professional wrestling industry in 2010 following Misawa's death.

Return to All Japan Pro Wrestling (2015-present) 
Inoue broke his retirement on December 3, 2015, wrestling for All Japan Pro Wrestling as "All Mighty Inoue". He appeared sporadically with AJPW over the following years, appearing in tag team matches and six-man tag team matches.

Professional wrestling style and persona 
Inoue wrestles in a "technical" style. His finishing moves include the somersault senton and the sunset flip. He customarily wrestles in red tights.

Championships and accomplishments 
All Japan Pro Wrestling
All Asia Tag Team Championship (4 times) – with Ashura Hara (1 time), Animal Hamaguchi (1 time), and Takashi Ishikawa (2 times)
NWA International Junior Heavyweight Championship (1 time)
World Junior Heavyweight Championship (1 time)

International Wrestling Enterprise
IWA World Heavyweight Championship (1 time)
IWA World Tag Team Championship (6 times) – with Ashura Hara (1 time), Animal Hamaguchi (2 times), and Great Kusatsu (3 times)

References

External links 
 

1949 births
20th-century professional wrestlers
All Asia Tag Team Champions
Japanese male professional wrestlers
Living people
NWA International Junior Heavyweight Champions
People from Kobe
Professional wrestling referees